Çıraqdərə (official name until 1992.) is a village in the Goygol District of Azerbaijan. The village had an Armenian population before the exodus of Armenians from Azerbaijan after the outbreak of the Nagorno-Karabakh conflict.

References

External links 

Populated places in Goygol District